Ruby Barker (born 23 December 1996) is a British actress. She is best known for playing Marina in the Netflix period drama Bridgerton (2020–present). In 2020, she was awarded Best Actress at the British Urban Film Festival for her starring role in the film How to Stop a Recurring Dream.

Early life
Barker was born in Islington to parents from Ireland and Montserrat. She joined her sister Harriet in the foster care system just after she was born, and the two were adopted. Barker spent her early childhood in London and Winchester before growing up in Glasgow until her teen years. While living in Glasgow, she took weekend classes at the Elizabeth Murray School of Dance. Her earliest acting experience was in an RBS advertisement.

Her parents eventually separated, and Barker moved to Church Fenton, a village in the Selby District of Yorkshire, with her mother and stepmother. She attended Tadcaster Grammar School nearby. She planned to study International Relations at the London School of Economics after taking a gap year, but decided to pursue Drama instead. She worked at the National Railway Museum in York while participating in local theatre productions.

Career
Barker played Mercy and Titivillus in the 2015 National Centre for Early Music production of Mankind. She was discovered by Royal Shakespeare Company director Phillip Breen, who cast her as Mary in the 2016 York Mystery Plays and helped her get signed with an agency. Barker then began to appear on television, landing a recurring role as Daisie in the fifth series of the CBBC teen fantasy series Wolfblood. In 2018, Barker starred as Private Sarah Findlay in the play Of Close Quarters at Sheffield Theatres.

In 2020, Barker began playing Marina in the Shondaland-produced Netflix period drama Bridgerton. She made her feature film debut in the thriller film How to Stop a Recurring Dream. For her performance, she was awarded Best Actress at the British Urban Film Festival. In 2022, Barker made her London stage debut in Running with Lions at the Lyric Theatre in Hammersmith. She has an upcoming role in the horror film Baghead.

Personal life
Barker disclosed that she had been hospitalised in 2022 for mental health reasons, stating that she was "really unwell for a really long time" and she has "all this intergenerational trauma bundled up inside" her. She revealed she was recovering, and was discharged from the hospital by 30 May 2022. She also encouraged her supporters to seek out professional help if they are struggling. She revealed in January 2023 that her father had died.

Acting credits

Film

Television

Audio

Theatre

Awards and nominations

References

External links

Living people
1996 births
21st-century British actresses
Actresses from Glasgow
Actresses from Yorkshire
Black British actresses
British adoptees
British people of Irish descent
British people of Montserratian descent
People from Selby District